Alexandr Alexandrovich Mukhin (born 28 July 1998) is a Kazakh biathlete. He has competed in the Biathlon World Cup since 2020.

Career results

World Championships

References

External links

1998 births
Living people
Kazakhstani male biathletes
Biathletes at the 2022 Winter Olympics
Olympic biathletes of Kazakhstan
Kazakhstani people of Russian descent
People from Akmola Region
21st-century Kazakhstani people
Competitors at the 2023 Winter World University Games
Medalists at the 2023 Winter World University Games
Universiade medalists in biathlon
Universiade silver medalists for Kazakhstan
Universiade bronze medalists for Kazakhstan